Orthocarpus luteus is a species of flowering plant in the broomrape family known by the common name yellow owl's-clover. It is native to much of western and central North America, where it grows in many types of plateau, grassland, and mountain habitat.

Description
It is an annual herb producing a slender, hairy, glandular, bright yellowish green to deep purple  stem up to about 40 centimeters tall. The narrow leaves are up to 5 centimeters long, the upper ones sometimes divided into three lobes. The inflorescence is a dense cylindrical spike of green bracts, the flowers emerging from between them. The lightly hairy flowers are 1 to 1.5 centimeters long and bright yellow in color. They are club-shaped, the upper lip a tiny, curving beak and the lower lip a narrow pouch.

See also
List of Canadian plants by family S
List of Scrophulariales of Montana

References

External links

Jepson Manual Treatment
USDA Plants Profile
Southwest Colorado Wildflowers
Photo gallery

Orobanchaceae
Flora of the United States
Flora of the Western United States
Flora of California
Flora of Canada
Flora of North America
Flora without expected TNC conservation status